Drink mixers are the non-alcoholic ingredients in mixed drinks and cocktails. Mixers dilute the drink, lowering the alcohol by volume in the drink. They change, enhance, or add new flavors to a drink. They may make the drink sweeter, more sour, or more savory. Some mixers change the texture or consistency of the drink, making it thicker or more watery. Drink mixers may also be used strictly for decorative purposes by changing the color or appearance of the drink. They also simply increase the volume of a drink, to make it last longer.

Caffeinated beverages

Caffeine, a stimulant, masks some of the depressant effects of alcohol.

 Coffee
 Energy drinks – Red Bull, etc.
 Iced tea, sweetened – Lipton BRISK, Nestea, etc.

Carbonated mixers and sodas

Carbonation adds a festive flair to drinks.  It also increases the absorption of the alcohol into the blood stream due to increased pressure in the stomach, potentially resulting in faster intoxication.

 Bitter lemonflavored with quinine and lemon (both juice and pith)
 Carbonated water (also called club soda, soda water, seltzer water, or sparkling water)
 Cola – Coca-Cola, Pepsi, etc.
 Ginger ale
 Ginger beer
 Hoppy
 Lemon Sour
 Squirt (soft drink)
 Lemon–lime soda7 Up, Sprite, etc.
 Root beer, orange, grape, and cherry soda, and various other fruit and herb–flavored soft drinks are used, but typically they have not been as popular as the drinks listed above.
 Tonic water - The essential ingredient is quinine.  Sugar and other flavorings are also commonly added.

Dairy products
Milk products add a smoothing effect to the feel of the drink to counteract the burn of the alcohol. They also turn the drinks opaque, usually enhancing and lightening the color of the drink.

 Cream
 Eggnog
 Half and half
 Ice cream
 Milk

Juices

Juices are flavorful additions. Some add sweetness, others add a sour tang, and add a sweet-tart sensation. Fruit juices are common additions to rum-based cocktails.

 Apple cider (not to be confused with cider, known as hard cider in the U.S.)
 Coconut milk or coconut water
 Cranberry juice
 Grape juice
 Grapefruit juice
 Lemon juice
 Lemonade
 Lime juice, unsweetened
 Limeade
 Olive juice
 Orange juice
 Pineapple juice
 Tomato juice – plain or flavored (V–8, Clamato, etc.)
 Wheatgrass juice

Prepared mixes

Some suppliers now manufacture pre-made mixes, which contain all the ingredients for a particular drink pre-mixed. The only thing that needs to be added is alcohol.

Some ingredients may be homogenized to form an emulsion with the aid of an emulsifier containing refined vegetable oil. The process prevents the separation of alcohol and cream during storage for example.

 Bloody Mary mix
 Cosmopolitan mix
 Hot Toddy mix
 Margarita mix
 Mojito mix
 Mudslide mix
 Strawberry Daiquiri mix

Sauces
The addition of a sauce usually imparts a surprising new taste to a familiar drink. Hot sauces are commonly used in drinking games.

 Honey
 Hot sauce – Tabasco sauce, etc.
 Worcestershire sauce

Syrups

The key ingredient in a syrup is sugar, which sweetens any drink into which it is mixed. Other flavors are often added to a sugar syrup.

 Demerara syrup – A combination of Demerara sugar, a natural brown sugar, and water.
 Falernum – Of Caribbean origin, flavored with almonds, ginger and/or cloves, and lime.
 Fassionola - A passion fruit, orange and guava juice syrup; variations include hibiscus and strawberry flavors
 Grenadine – Originally made from pomegranate juice, modern varieties vary in composition.
 Lime juice, sweetened – Rose's lime juice, etc.
 Orgeat – Flavored with almonds and either rose water or orange flower water.
 Simple syrup – A combination of granulated sugar and water.
 Sour mix – Also known as sweet and sour mix, a combination of simple syrup and lemon or lime juice.
 Squash – A concentrated fruit- or herbal-flavored syrup.

Other mixers
Many other food and beverage items can be used in mixed drinks. These are some other common ones.

 Egg – egg whites thicken and increase the foaminess of blended drinks.
 Food coloring
 Sports drink – Gatorade, SunnyD, Redbull, etc.

See also

 Cocktail garnish
 List of cocktails
 Mixed drink shooters and drink shots

 Categories
 :Category:Drink mixers
 :Category:Mixed drinks
 :Category:Soft drinks

References

External links 
 
 

 
Alcohol-related lists
 Drink mixers
Soft drinks